The Palm Beach Photographic Centre is a non-profit visual arts organization dedicated to the enrichment of life through exhibitions and educational activities that promote the photographic arts.  It is located in West Palm Beach, Florida.

History
The Palm Beach Photographic Center was founded by Art & Fatima Nejame and was originally located in Boca Raton, Florida. In the early 1990s, the Photographic Center relocated to the Pineapple Grove arts district in the City of Delray Beach where it became a leading educational center in digital photos.

FotoFusion
In the 1990s, the Center developed the annual FotoFusion photography festival, which has hosted international photographers such as Gordon Parks. The Palm Beach County Cultural Council estimated that the FotoFusion festival contributed significant revenue to the City of Delray Beach.

Relocation/Library

References

Palm Beach Post
Sun-Sentinel
Palm Beach County Cultural Council

External links
 Palm Beach Photographic Center - official site
 FotoFusion

Museums in West Palm Beach, Florida
Art museums and galleries in Florida
Photography museums and galleries in the United States